Glaslyn is a village in the Canadian province of Saskatchewan within the Rural Municipality of Parkdale No. 498 and Census Division No. 17. The village is located 67 km north of the City of North Battleford and 91 km south of Meadow Lake at the intersection of Highway 4 and Highway 3.

History 
Glaslyn incorporated as a village on April 16, 1929.

Demographics 

Recreation
The village has a hockey arena, bowling lanes, baseball diamonds as well as local parks and a regional park nearby.
Glaslyn Minor Hockey
Glaslyn Figure Skating Club
Glaslyn Minor Ball Association
Glaslyn Heritage Lanes
Little Loon Regional Park

Education
In Northwest School Division #203, Glaslyn Central School offers grades K-12 to about 115 students.

See also 
 List of communities in Saskatchewan
 Villages of Saskatchewan

References

Villages in Saskatchewan
Parkdale No. 498, Saskatchewan
Division No. 17, Saskatchewan